John Maxwell Brownjohn (11 April 1929 – 6 January 2020) was a British literary translator.

Career

John Brownjohn translated more than 160 books, and won the Schlegel-Tieck Prize for German translation three times and the Helen and Kurt Wolff Prize once.

Film

Brownjohn also collaborated with the filmmaker Roman Polanski on Tess (1979), Pirates (1986), Bitter Moon (1992), The Ninth Gate (1999) and The Pianist (2002).

Personal life

Brownjohn was born in Rickmansworth, Hertfordshire. He died in January 2020 at the age of 90.

Selected works
 Frank Arnau: The Art of the Faker
 Marcel Beyer: The Karnau Tapes  
 Willy Brandt: People and Politics: The Years, 1960-75 (Schlegel-Tieck Prize) 
 Thomas Brussig: Heroes Like Us (Schlegel-Tieck Prize, Helen and Kurt Wolff Translator's Prize)
 Thomas Glavinic: Night Work 
 Martin Gregor-Dellin: Richard Wagner: His Life, His Work, His Century
 Lothar Günther Buchheim: The Boat 
 Hans Hellmut Kirst: The Night of the Generals 
 Bodo Kirchhoff: Infanta (Schlegel-Tieck Prize)
 Georg Klein: Libidissi
 Walter Moers: City of Dreaming Books
 Walter Moers: A Wild Ride Through the Night
 Dietlof Reiche: The Golden Hamster Saga
 Alain Claude Sulzer: A Perfect Waiter
 Leo Perutz: The Swedish Cavalier (Schlegel-Tieck Prize)

References

External links 
 
 INTERVIEW: John Brownjohn on Walter Moers and Translation, Mad Hatter's Bookshelf & Book Review blog, November 2012

British translators
German–English translators
1929 births
2020 deaths
People from Rickmansworth
Literary translators